Old Orchard Beach station is an Amtrak intercity train station in Old Orchard Beach, Maine. It features a covered platform, and is served by Amtrak's Downeaster service seasonally between May and October.

The station is located next to the Pan Am Railways mainline, formerly the Western Route mainline of the Boston & Maine Railroad.

Notable places nearby 
The station is within walking distance of the following notable places:
 Old Orchard Beach
 Ocean Park Historic Buildings
 Palace Playland amusement park
 Numerous hotels, motels, shops, and restaurants

References

External links 

Old Orchard Beach Amtrak Station (USA Rail Guide -- Train Web)

Amtrak stations in Maine
Stations along Boston and Maine Railroad lines
Old Orchard Beach, Maine
Transportation buildings and structures in York County, Maine
Railway stations in the United States opened in 2003